The 1955 East Texas State Lions football team was an American football team that represented East Texas State Teachers College—now known as Texas A&M University–Commerce–as a member of the Lone Star Conference (LSC) during the 1955 college football season. Led by second-year head coach Jules V. Sikes, the Lions compiled an overall record of 5–4 with a mark of 5–1 in conference play, sharing the LSC title with Sam Houston State and Southwest Texas State.

Schedule

References

East Texas State
Texas A&M–Commerce Lions football seasons
Lone Star Conference football champion seasons
East Texas State Lions football